The TSG Hawks are a professional baseball team in the Chinese Professional Baseball League (CPBL) in Taiwan. The team is owned by Taiwan Steel Group and was formed in 2022 as part of CPBL's expansion. The Hawks are set to play their home games at Chengcing Lake Baseball Stadium in Kaohsiung City in CPBL's minor league starting 2023 season, and to make their debut in the major league in the 2024 season.

Ownership

The Taiwan Steel Group is the sponsor for Tainan City F.C., a semi-professional football team in the Taiwan Football Premier League since 2016, and the owner of Tainan TSG GhostHawks, a professional basketball team in Taiwan's T1 League since 2021.

History

On March 2, 2022, TSG officially applied for membership in the CPBL, which was approved by CPBL executive council on April 27, 2022.

In July of the same year, the Hawks participated in CPBL's 2022 season draft where they picked a total of 30 players to form the basis of their initial roster.

On January 16, 2023, Hong I-Chung had been announced as the first manager of the team.

References

Chinese Professional Baseball League teams
Sport in Kaohsiung
2022 establishments in Taiwan
Baseball teams established in 2022